Hedeyli is a  village in Hayrabolu district of Tekirdağ Province, Turkey,  It is situated in the eastern Trakya (Thrace) plains at . The population of the village is 331 as of 2011. It was a Bulgarian village during the Ottoman Empire era. But after the Second Balkan War the Bulgarian population was forced to leave the settlement.

References

Villages in Tekirdağ Province